describes the practice of carrying an artillery piece on a truck which can be fired from the vehicle or quickly dismounted and fired from the ground. The term is most often used to describe anti-tank equipments used by the British, Commonwealth and imperial forces in the Western Desert Campaign of the Second World War. Modern terms for mounting weapons on vehicles are technical or gun truck.

Interwar

US Cavalry
 cavalry was horse cavalry – horses and riders – carried in trucks or other vehicles. The cavalry is thus mechanized for strategic and operational movement and horse-mounted for tactical deployment.  cavalry units were briefly tested in the American army during the interwar period change from fully-horsed cavalry to fully-mechanized cavalry but were generally found to be overcomplicated and not worthwhile.

British Army, 1939–1943

2-pounder anti-tank gun 

An Ordnance QF 2 pounder (40 mm) anti-tank gun mounted on a Morris CS8 15 cwt truck, Chevrolet WA or WB 30-cwt truck, Canadian Military Pattern Ford F30 or Chevrolet C30 trucks and fired over the tailboard.

6-pounder anti-tank gun 

An Ordnance QF 6 pounder (57 mm) anti-tank gun mounted on a Bedford QLT 3-ton lorry or Austin K5 3 ton lorry. Both vehicles had a special frame-only body carrying the gun, crew, ammunition and the rarely used side shields. A F60 or C60 with cut down number 13 cab was similarly used. The size and weight of the new gun led to it being dismounted before going into action more often than the smaller 2-pounder.

20 mm anti-aircraft gun 

An Oerlikon 20 mm anti-aircraft gun mounted on a Morris 15 cwt truck

25 mm anti-tank gun 

A 25 mm Hotchkiss anti-tank gun mounted on a Morris 15 cwt truck

37 mm anti-tank gun 
A Bofors 37 mm anti-tank gun mounted on a Bedford MW or Morris CS8 15cwt used by 106 Royal Horse Artillery during Operation Compass at Beda Fomm.

Deacon

The 6-pounder gun was mounted within a three-sided and roofed armoured shield on a turntable on the back of an armoured AEC Matador chassis. The limited traverse of the gun was mitigated by the Matador driver turning the vehicle. A battery of Deacons were issued per anti-tank regiment as a mobile reserve but by the end of the North African Campaign in May 1943 were obsolete and were replaced by US M10 tank destroyers before operations began in Europe.

Operational history

Sidi Rezegh
On 21 November 1941 at Sidi Rezegh in Libya, during Operation Crusader, J Battery, 3rd Regiment Royal Horse Artillery with its 2-pounders resisted a German counter-attack by Panzer IV tanks. The engagement has been cited by modern historians as an epic example of leadership and courage under fire. Second Lieutenant George Ward Gunn fought with his (A) troop until it had only one gun left in action. The battery commander Major Bernard Pinney MC ordered Ward Gunn to remove the dead crew on a serviceable gun and get it back into action. In a short space of time the gun caught fire so Pinney, exposed to enemy fire, got up to put out the fire. When Ward Gunn was killed, Pinney pushed his body out of the way to continue single-handed until it was eventually put out of action by direct fire. Pinney was killed by a stray shell the following day. Both men were recommended for the Victoria Cross and Ward Gunn received the award (posthumous).

105th Anti-tank Regiment RA

Changes of equipment from 1941 to 1944.

 1941–1942: Western Desert, 2-pounder 

 1942–1943: Western Desert and Tunisia, 2 batteries 6-pounder , 2 batteries Deacon

 1943: Sicily, 2 batteries 6-pounder towed, 2 batteries 17-pounder towed

 1944: Italy, 1 battery 6-pounder towed, 1 battery 17-pounder towed, 2 batteries M 10 (12 guns per battery)

Notes

Footnotes

References

Further reading

External links

 Guns Against Tanks: L Troop, 33rd Battery, 7th New Zealand Anti-Tank Regiment in Libya, 23 November 1941

World War II vehicles of the United Kingdom
Military trucks
Off-road vehicles
Improvised armoured fighting vehicles